Sukashitrochus pulcher is a species of minute sea snail, a marine gastropod mollusk or micromollusk in the family Scissurellidae, the little slit snails.

Description
The shell grows to a height of 1.5 mm.

Distribution
This marin e species occurs off Northern Queensland to Southwest Western Australia; off Japan and off Vanuatu

References

External links
 To Encyclopedia of Life
 To World Register of Marine Species
 

Scissurellidae
Gastropods described in 1884